Sparkman is a surname. Notable people with the surname include:

Glenn Sparkman (born 1992), American baseball pitcher
John Sparkman (1899–1985), American jurist and politician
Stephen M. Sparkman (1849–1929), American politician
Wiley Sparkman (1906–1995), American politician